L&B Spumoni Gardens is a pizzeria-restaurant in the Gravesend neighborhood of Brooklyn in New York City. Originally conceived as an ice and spumoni stand prior to World War II, it grew during the mid-1950s into a full-scale pizzeria that's known today primarily for its Sicilian pizza and ices. The restaurant has been featured on the show Man v. Food. NY Eater critic Robert Sietsema considers L&B Spumoni Gardens a must-try Italian American restaurant in Brooklyn.  They were featured on Andrew Zimmern’s show The Zimmern List.

History
Founder Ludovico Barbati came to the United States in 1917 from Torella dei Lombardi, Italy. In 1938, Barbati sold Spumoni and Italian Ice from a horse and wagon. In 1939, he purchased a vacant property on 86th Street to make the spumoni and ice. By the mid 1950s, the location came to be L&B Spumoni Gardens, with the spumoni factory, a pizzeria and a luncheonette all on site.

In 2016, one of the co-owners, Louis Barbati, 61, was murdered outside his home in Dyker Heights. In 2019, another co-owner, Patricia Barbati Coffey, 56, died after a seven-year battle with ALS.

See also
 List of restaurants in New York City

References

1939 establishments in New York City
Gravesend, Brooklyn
Italian-American culture in New York City
Pizzerias in New York City
Restaurants established in 1939
Restaurants in Brooklyn
Sicilian-American cuisine